Kálmán Tihanyi or in English language technical literature often mentioned as Coloman Tihanyi or Koloman Tihanyi (28 April 1897 – 26 February 1947) was a Hungarian physicist, electrical engineer and inventor. One of the early pioneers of electronic television, he made significant contributions to the development of cathode ray tubes (CRTs), which were bought and further developed by the Radio Corporation of America (later RCA), and German companies Loewe and Fernseh AG. He invented and designed the world's first automatic pilotless aircraft in Great Britain. He is also known for the invention of the first infrared video camera in 1929, and coined the first flat panel (plasma) display in 1936. His Radioskop patent became part of the UNESCO's Memory of the World Programme.

Career

Early life, WW1 and education

Born in Üzbég, Kingdom of Hungary (now Zbehy, Slovakia),  After graduating in the local elementary school, his parents enrolled him in the Vocational School of Electrical Engineering in Pozsony (now Bratislava), where he filed his first patent application for the Hungarian Patent Office in 1913, at the age of sixteen (!), The title of the patent was "Pocket device for light handling of photographic plates". The first contract of his life with a Viennese company, which purchased his equipment for the central, wireless switching on and off of road lights. At that time, he continued his high school studies in Vác, he graduated here as well, and the following year, in 1916, he entered the Hungarian Royal Army as a volunteer. As an officer candidate for the 4th Army Artillery Regiment, the young man first handled the roaring cannons on the eastern front and was then transferred to Transylvania, where he took part in the battles at one of the most important crossings in the Eastern Carpathians, the Ojtozi Strait. His brave standing was awarded a bronze medal of valor and then the rank of lieutenant. Soon, however, he was transferred to one of the most important military ports of the Austro-Hungarian Monarchy in Pula, where he no longer served as a soldier in a combat unit, but as a radio engineer, and for the first time in his life he “tasted” military technical developments. He designed a remotely controlled igniter for timing and detonating underwater shafts, and his land mine was credited as a distinguished military invention.

Interwar period

After World War I, Kálmán Tihanyi, who returned to civil life, continued his studies at the Royal Hungarian Joseph University of Technology in Budapest (today: Budapest University of Technology and Economics, commonly known as the Technical University), where the young man who has recently lost his father was left without any income. Luckily, he found a friend in Professor Imre Pöschl, who recognized his talent, while he could sell more and more patents and inventions, he could enjoy an increasing income, thus he could support his widowed mother and nine siblings.

Tihany's attention was already drawn to the attempts to create television during World War I. After Tihanyi studied Maxwell's equations, he discovered a hitherto unknown physical phenomenon.

The problem of low sensitivity to light resulting in low electrical output from transmitting or "camera" tubes would be solved with the introduction of charge-storage technology by Tihanyi in the beginning of 1924. His final design was patented under the name "Radioskop" in 1926. He described his cathode ray tube, charge-storage television system in not one, but in three versions - wired, wireless, and color, which meant he was thinking of color television even when black and white films were made in the vast majority of the film industry. His patent application contained 42 pages detailing its design and mass production. It is recorded in UNESCO's Memory of the World Programme. Though it bears certain similarities to earlier proposals employing a cathode ray tube (CRT) for both transmitter and receiver, Tihanyi's system represented a radical departure. Like the final, improved version Tihanyi would patent in 1928, it embodied an entirely new concept in design and operation, building upon a technology that would become known as the "storage principle". This technology involves the maintenance of photoemission from the light-sensitive layer of the detector tube between scans. By this means, accumulation of charges would take place and the "latent electric picture" would be stored. Tihanyi filed two separate patent applications in 1928 then extended patent protection beyond Germany, filing in France, the United Kingdom, the United States, and elsewhere.

Berlin
In 1928, Tihanyi went to Berlin, where the development of mechanical television involving Nipkow disks had already been begun by the German Post Office and the larger manufacturers. He set up his own laboratory in Berlin, where he made his first experimental picture tube with his younger brother, who also was an electrical engineer.  The invention was received with enthusiasm by Telefunken and Siemens, but in the end, they opted to continue with the development of mechanical television. Then he was approached by the American Radio Corporation of America (RCA), contracted with him to purchase his patent, and began laboratory development of the image resolution tube. After a few months, the first well-functioning American camera tubes which based on Tihanyi's ideas were completed by Vladimir Zworykin at RCA, and the new television system was named the iconoscope.

London
In 1929, he moved to London, where he was invited to work on television guidance for defense applications, building prototypes of a camera for remotely guided aircraft for the British Air Ministry, and later adapting it for the Italian Navy.  The solutions of the technology what Tihanyi depicted in his 1929 patent were so influential, that American UAV producing companies still used many of its ideas even half century later, until the mid 1980s. In 1929, he invented the World's first infrared-sensitive (night vision) electronic television camera for anti-aircraft defense in Britain. In London he was commissioned with the designing of the remote-control devices and fire control systems for tanks, anti-aircraft guns and anti-aircraft reflectors for Britain.

Tihanyi's U.S. patents for his display and camera tubes, assigned to RCA, were issued in 1938 and 1939, respectively.

Budapest

In 1936 Tihanyi described the principle of "plasma television" and conceived the first flat-panel television system. It involved a single “transmission 
point” being moved at great speed behind a grid of cells arranged in a thin 
panel display, which would be excited to different levels by varying the 
voltages to the point

World War Two

"Titan" Ultrasound weapon

In the summer of 1940, he returned home with an elaborate plan for the acoustic beam projector. The experiments with Titan Ultrasound Weapon, codenamed TVR, were surrounded by the greatest secret. To achieve this, it soon reached an agreement with the approval of the Supreme Military Technical Council. It was completed by the end of 1941 by organizing the work, making construction drawings, setting up a plant and two laboratories.  The large workpieces were made in the Ganz and Láng factories; everything else, including a 2-meter-diameter parabolic mirror, was manufactured by themselves. He selected 45 Jewish origin employees of the Hungarian Royal Special Military Corps, including nine engineers, from the ranks of military labourers. In this way, Tihanyi could help his Jewish origin friends and colleagues to avoid the deportation. In the second half of 1943, the situation became increasingly tense because of his staff, who were occasionally replaced by potentially dangerous people. Tihanyi had no doubt, that they were placed under surveillance and it was also leaked that he joined to Endre Bajcsy-Zsilinszky's anti-fascist circle which included  György Parragi, Sándor Márai, Jenő Katona, Pál Almássy, István Barankovics, Nomád (István Léner Lendvai) and Jenő Tombor. He considered it increasingly probable that the machine would not only serve the Hungarian interests but that it could now inevitably fall into German hands. Thus began the delay in completion while maintaining the appearance of "work". After the German occupation of Hungary, Tihanyi emerged in a desperate situation. On April 11, 1944, he was taken from Hadik Barracks to Margit Boulevard Military Prison, where he was held in probation for five months, in solitary confinement, he was accused of high treason as an alleged British Agent and member of MI6. Despite having only a loose contact with MI6 officers during his scientific work for the Royal Air Force and Air Ministry, Tihanyi was not a member of the British Secret Intelligence Service.

Post War period and death
At the end of the war, despite his physically deteriorated condition, he was back to working 16–17 hours a day. In his factory, he started to manufacture his new solution (internally hollow) ball bearing. Already in June 1945, he took steps to found a Hungarian television company, build a transmitter station and organise a picture tube factory. He postponed this plan, however, and, choosing among dozens of ideas based on ultrasound technology. He decided to work on his invention of a gold centrifuge. To realise this idea, he decided to develop his own invention. He teamed up with professor Lajos Lóczy, the director of the Institute of Geology, to build a prototype.

His first heart attack in the winter of 1946 indicated that his body could not cope with the accelerated pace. But a second heart attack overcame him and ended his life immediately on 26 February 1947.

Charge-storage and a new physical phenomenon (1924)
In a Technikatörténeti Szemle article, subsequently reissued on the internet, entitled The Iconoscope: Kalman Tihanyi and the Development of Modern Television, Tihanyi's daughter Katalin Tihanyi Glass notes that her father found the "storage principle" included a "new physical phenomenon", the photoconductive effect:

See also
Memory of the World Programme, UNESCO
History of television
History of unmanned aerial vehicles
Thermographic camera
Plasma display

References
 "Radioskop", filed March 2o, 1926. File No. T-3768, Patent Office Documents, Hungarian National Archives.

External links

Forward to start at www.mtesz.hu
 Kálmán Tihanyi
http://www.unesco.org/webworld/mdm
http://www.iec.ch/about/history/techline/swf/techline.htm 
Thinkers through the Ages, Scientists and Inventors
Ungarisches Staatsarchiv  at www.mol.gov.hu

Hungarian electrical engineers
20th-century Hungarian inventors
20th-century Hungarian physicists
People from Nitra District
Television pioneers
1897 births
1947 deaths